New Jersey's 34th Legislative District is one of 40 districts that make up the map for the New Jersey Legislature. It encompasses the Essex County municipalities of East Orange, Montclair, and Orange and the Passaic County city of Clifton.

Demographic information
As of the 2020 United States census, the district had a population of 235,276, of whom 182,601 (77.6%) were of voting age. The racial makeup of the district was 71,652 (30.5%) White, 91,979 (39.1%) African American, 1,662 (0.7%) Native American, 11,466 (4.9%) Asian, 85 (0.0%) Pacific Islander, 33,481 (14.2%) from some other race, and 24,951 (10.6%) from two or more races. Hispanic or Latino of any race were 59,478 (25.3%) of the population.

The district had 159,091 registered voters , of whom 53,459 (33.6%) were registered as unaffiliated, 89,134 (56.0%) were registered as Democrats, 14,653 (9.2%) were registered as Republicans, and 1,845 (1.2%) were registered to other parties.

Political representation
For the 2022–2023 session, the district is represented in the State Senate by Nia Gill (D, Montclair) and in the General Assembly by Thomas P. Giblin (D, Montclair) and Britnee Timberlake (D, East Orange).

The legislative district overlaps with New Jersey's 9th, 10th and 11th congressional districts.

District composition since 1973
When the 40-district legislative map was created in 1973, the 34th District was originally located in southern Passaic County containing the municipalities of Passaic, Clifton, Little Falls, West Paterson, Totowa, and Haledon. After the 1981 redistricting, the 34th lost Passaic and Haledon picked up the large township of Wayne and Essex County municipalities of North Caldwell, West Caldwell, and Fairfield. Following the 1991 redistricting, West Paterson was removed and the western Essex County municipalities were swapped with Glen Ridge and Bloomfield.

In 2001, as a result of that year's redistricting, Bloomfield and almost all of Passaic County was removed from the district, leaving Clifton and West Paterson (renamed Woodland Park in 2007), and picking up East Orange and Montclair, municipalities formerly in the 27th District.

The 34th had previously been Republican-leaning but after the 2001 redistricting, with the addition of large minority populations in East Orange and Montclair, the 34th became Democratic-leaning.  27th District Assemblywoman, Democrat Nia Gill defeated incumbent Republican State Senator Norman M. Robertson in 2001.

Then a resident of Montclair and capitalizing on his connections with Rudy Giuliani, Ken Kurson ran in 2003 for election to the General Assembly in the 34th District as a moderate Republican, hoping to capitalize on divisions within the Democratic Party following a bitter primary battle. In a district that was reapportioned to be "so overwhelmingly Democratic that general elections would be nothing more than a formality", Kurson received 17.6% of the vote and ran a distant third behind Democratic incumbent Peter C. Eagler (with 33.2%) and his running mate Sheila Oliver (31.0%).

In 2017, Oliver was selected by Phil Murphy to be his running mate for Lieutenant Governor of New Jersey. While state law prohibits running for two offices on the same ballot, Democrats claimed a loophole by the fact that Lieutenant Governor is not a position where candidates are nominated by petition. Oliver won both re-election to the Assembly and election on Murphy's ticket in November, and resigned her Assembly seat on January 9, 2018 to accept the statewide position. Democratic committee members in Essex and Passaic Counties selected Essex County Freeholder Britnee Timberlake as her replacement in the Assembly; she was sworn in on January 29.

Election history

Election results

Senate

General Assembly

References

Essex County, New Jersey
Passaic County, New Jersey
34